Andrei Valentinovich Khomutov (born April 21, 1961) is a Russian former ice hockey right winger. He was the head coach for Barys Astana of the Kontinental Hockey League (KHL) and Kazakhstan national team during 2010–2011 season. He played for CSKA Moscow (Red Army team) from 1979–1990, then in Switzerland for HC Fribourg-Gottéron from 1990–1998. He was most valuable player in the Soviet league in 1990, and also led the league in goals in 1988.

Khomutov played for the Soviet national team from 1981–83, 1985–87, and 1989; for the Unified team in 1992, and for Russia in 1993, and 1995. He was on the winning side at the 1981 Canada Cup; the IIHF World Championships in 1981, 1982, 1983, 1986, 1989, and 1993; and the 1984, 1988, and 1992 Winter Olympics.

Career statistics

Regular season and playoffs

International

References

External links

Andrei Khomutov at CCCP International

1961 births
Barys Astana head coaches
HC CSKA Moscow players
HC Fribourg-Gottéron players
Ice hockey players at the 1984 Winter Olympics
Ice hockey players at the 1988 Winter Olympics
Ice hockey players at the 1992 Winter Olympics
IIHF Hall of Fame inductees
Kazakhstan men's national ice hockey team coaches
Living people
Medalists at the 1984 Winter Olympics
Olympic gold medalists for the Soviet Union
Olympic gold medalists for the Unified Team
Olympic ice hockey players of the Soviet Union
Olympic ice hockey players of the Unified Team
Olympic medalists in ice hockey
Sportspeople from Yaroslavl
Quebec Nordiques draft picks
Russian ice hockey coaches
Russian ice hockey right wingers
Soviet expatriate ice hockey players
Soviet expatriate sportspeople in Switzerland
Soviet ice hockey right wingers
Medalists at the 1988 Winter Olympics
Medalists at the 1992 Winter Olympics
Russian expatriate sportspeople in Switzerland
Russian expatriate ice hockey people
Expatriate ice hockey players in Switzerland